Correspondence is a relationship between two levels of existence. The term was coined by the 18th-century theologian Emanuel Swedenborg in his Arcana Cœlestia (1749–1756), Heaven and Hell (1758) and other works.

Swedenborg

Definition
In the terminology of Swedenborg's revelation, “correspondence” is a basic relationship found between two levels of existence.

Thus, for instance, light corresponds to wisdom because wisdom enlightens the mind as light enlightens the eye. Warmth corresponds to love because love warms the mind as heat does the body. Swedenborg says that the Word (Bible) was written by God entirely according to correspondences so that within its natural laws and histories every detail describes the spiritual realities relating to God and man, these being the true subject of the Word. Swedenborg's 12-volume Arcana Coelestia provides verse-by-verse details of the inner meaning of Genesis and part of Exodus; the work Apocalypse Revealed does the same for the Book of Revelation. The Arcana Coelestia, for example, explains how the creation  and development of the human mind corresponds to the seven days of creation in Genesis.

The Ancient Word
According to Swedenborg, angels speak to each other in correspondences, and in the early days of the Golden Age people on this earth also could speak in correspondences so that they could communicate directly with the angels. They had a holy book, the Ancient Word, which was written in correspondences, and which is still used in heaven. As the human race fell into evil, the ability to understand correspondences was lost, as was  most of the Ancient Word. What was preserved of the Ancient Word, according to Swedenborg, are the first eleven chapters of Genesis. In Swedenborg's view, the first seven of these chapters were copied verbatim. He also perceived references in the Bible to various books of the Ancient Church which he thought to be now lost, including the “Wars of Jehovah” (Numbers 21:14-15), “Enunciators” or “Prophetic Enunciations” (Numbers 21:27-30) and the “Book of Jashar” or “Book of the Upright” (Jeremiah 48: 45, 46; 2 Samuel 1:17, 18; Joshua 10: 12, 13).

Of note is that, according to Swedenborg, the stories from the Ancient Word were all made-up history, written in correspondences. This would also hold for the first 11 chapters of Genesis. According to Swedenborg, making up such stories was an accepted custom in churches of antiquity, and spread widely. In fact, in Swedenborg's view, the actual history recorded in the Word was chosen because it had correspondence to an internal sense.  For example, psalm 78 tells the history of Israel, and actually says it is a parable.

When the Lord was in the world, he spoke by correspondences, and thus both spiritually and naturally at the same time. This Swedenborg thought to be apparent from the Biblical parables, in which he supposed every single expression to contain a spiritual sense. However, people of Jesus’ time only understood the natural literal level of his teaching. According to Swedenborg, correspondences were not disclosed to the primitive early Christians, because they were too simple to understand them. Thus Jesus said, “There is so much more I want to tell you, but you can’t bear it now.” (John 16:12).

Idolatry

In Swedenborg's view, the people of the Golden Age loved correspondences, and made small images to remind themselves of heavenly things. But as the human race declined into evil, and the knowledge of correspondences was almost lost, people began to worship the images themselves –in other words, they began to practice idolatry.

The Wise Men
According to Swedenborg, the knowledge of correspondences of the Ancient and Israelite Words spread widely in Asia, the Middle East and Africa. In Greece the correspondences were turned into the myths of antiquity. In Swedenborg's view there were people, notably those referred to as wise ones, diviners or magi, who still had some knowledge of correspondences until the time of the Lord's advent. This is evident from the Wise Men who came to the Lord at his birth; and this was why a star went before them, and why they brought gifts gold, frankincense, and myrrh (Matt. 2:1-2, 9-11). The star corresponded to knowledge from heaven,  gold to celestial goodness, frankincense to spiritual goodness, and myrrh to natural goodness.  According to Swedenborg, these three components are the correspondential basis for all worship.

Correspondences and Church Doctrine
In Swedenborg's view, Scripture cannot be properly understood without doctrine, and doctrines of the church should be confirmed from Scripture. True doctrine can only be known to those who are in enlightenment from the Lord, and those who are not can derive heresies from it. However, according to Swedenborg, the literal sense of Scripture does contain the Divine truth in all of its fullness and power, so that a person becomes conjoined with the Lord and his angels when reading it.<ref> Swedenborg, Emanuel. Doctrine concerning the Lord, 1763 (DL). Rotch Edition. New York: Houghton, Mifflin and Company, 1907, in The Divine Revelation of the New Jerusalem (2012), n. 50–61., 91–97, 62–69.</ref>

 Correspondence and esotericism 
Antoine Faivre posits four fundamental elements, necessary conditions for a document, group, or movement to be eligible for consideration by scholars as esoteric. The first one is Correspondence:

According to Riffard, 

See also
 As above, so below, a modern Hermetic maxim often understood in terms of Swedenborg's doctrine of correspondence
 Microcosm–macrocosm analogy, a similar view in ancient, medieval, and early modern philosophy
 Dmuta in Mandaeism

References

Sources

Kingslake, B. Inner Light. Swedenborg Explores the Spiritual Dimension  (Appleseed 1991 Chapter 19,)
Benz, E. Emanuel Swedenborg. Visionary Savant in the Age of Reason'' (Swedenborg Foundation 2002, Chapter 24)
Trobridge, G. Swedenborg Life and Teaching  (Swedenborg Foundation 1976)

Works by Emanuel Swedenborg
God in Christianity